The Venezuelan waltz is a hall dance and accompanying musical genre that was popularized in 19th-century Venezuela.

The two main types of waltz were the hall waltz and the popular waltz.  The former was typically performed on piano.  Key musicians in this genre were Federico Vollmer, Manuel Azpúrua, Manuel Guadalajara, Rafael Isaza, Heraclio Fernández, Rogelio Caraballo, Federico Villena, Ramon Delgado Palacios, and Antonio Lauro.

The popular waltz was performed on traditional regional instruments, often the violin and the bandola accompanied by guitar, triple and cuatro. Most popular waltzes had anonymous composers.

List of Venezuelan waltzes (partial)
"Dama antañona" (Francisco de Paula Aguirre)
"El Diablo Suelto" (Heraclio Fernández)
"Visión porteña" (Pedro Pablo Caldera)
"Adios an Ocumare" (Angel María Landaeta)
"Conticinio" (Laudelino Mejías)
"Teresita" (Teresa Carreño)
"Besos en mis sueños" (Augusto Brandt)
"Que bellas son las flores" (Francisco de Paula Aguirre)
"Sombras en los médanos" (Rafael Sánchez López)
"Quejas del alma" (Dr. Delgado Briceño)
"Flor de loto" (Francisco J. Marciales)
"Pluma y lira" (Telésforo Jaimes)
"Brisas del Zulia" (Amable Espina)
"Morir es nacer" (Rafael Andrade)
"María Luisa" (Antonio Lauro)
"El campo está florido" (Telésforo Jaimes)
"Las bellas noches de Maiquetía" (Pedro Areila Aponte)
"La Ruperta" (anonymous)
"Pablera" (Juan Ramón Barrios)
"Vals Nº 3 -Natalia-" (Antonio Lauro)
"Primavera "(Teresa Carreño)
"Geranio" (Pedro Elías Gutiérrez)

See also 
Venezuelan music
Joropo

Sources
Atlas de Tradiciones de Venezuela, Fundación Bigott, 1998.

Waltz
Waltz
Waltz, Venezuelan